The men's pole vault at the 1971 European Athletics Championships was held in Helsinki, Finland, at Helsinki Olympic Stadium on 11 and 13 August 1971.

Medalists

Results

Final
13 August

Qualification
11 August

Participation
According to an unofficial count, 20 athletes from 10 countries participated in the event.

 (1)
 (3)
 (3)
 (1)
 (2)
 (2)
 (2)
 (3)
 (1)
 (2)

References

Pole vault
Pole vault at the European Athletics Championships